Kabaddi was contested by six teams at the 1990 Asian Games in Beijing, China from September 23 to September 28 at the Teachers College of Physical Education.

India won the gold medal in a round robin competition.

Medalists

Results

 Since both Pakistan and Bangladesh were tied on points, a play-off game was played to decide the 2nd team.

Final standing

References
 New Straits Times, September 24–29, 1990

External links
 www.ocasia.org

 
1990 Asian Games events
1990
Asian Games
1990 Asian Games